Tupper may refer to:

Historical figures 
 Anselm Tupper (1763–1808), Continental Army officer, pioneer to the Ohio Country, son of Benjamin Tupper
 Archelaus Tupper (died 1781), sergeant in the Vermont militia, the circumstances of whose death in a skirmish with a British military unit caused a scandal when it became known that Vermont was engaged in separate peace negotiations with the British
 Benjamin Tupper (1738–1792), Continental Army officer, and pioneer to the Ohio Country
 Sir Charles Tupper (1821–1915), Prime Minister of Canada
 Frances Tupper, his wife
 Sir Charles Hibbert Tupper (1855–1927), their son, Solicitor General and Minister of Justice of Canada
 William Johnston Tupper (1862–1947), also their son, Lieutenant-Governor of Manitoba
 Charles F. Tupper (1852–1929), American lawyer and politician
 Clarrie Tupper (1908-1985), Australian rugby league footballer
 Earl Silas Tupper (1907–1983), American businessman, inventor of Tupperware
 Edward Tupper (1871 or 1872–1942), British Trade unionist
 Ferdinand Brock Tupper (1795–1874), British historian
 Jeff Tupper, the creator of Tupper's self-referential formula
 Rev. Henry Martin Tupper (1831–1893), founder of Shaw University
 Loretta Clemens Tupper (1906-1990), American singer, pianist, vaudevillian, and radio actress
 Martin Farquhar Tupper (1810–1889), English poet and antiquarian
 Stanley Roger Tupper (1921–2006), American politician, United States Congressman from Maine
 William Vaughn Tupper (1835–1898), Brooklyn financier, creator of the Tupper Scrapbooks

Fictional characters
Alf Tupper, comic strip character
Amos Tupper, sheriff on U.S. television's Murder, She Wrote
George Tupper, in P.G. Wodehouse's stories
Tommy Tupper, from The Benny Hill Show
Martin Tupper, from U.S. television's Dream On
Hannah Tupper, in The Witch of Blackbird Pond
Tupper the Bulldog, mascot of Bryant University
Tupper, a meth dealer from The Green Hornet

Locations
 Tupper Lake, New York
 Tuppers Plains, Ohio
 Point Tupper, Nova Scotia

Ships
 CCGS Tupper

Short
 Short for Tupperware

See also
 Tup (disambiguation)